Mark Peachey (31 October 1900 – 23 November 1987) was an Australian cricketer. He played in one first-class match for Queensland in 1928/29.

See also
 List of Queensland first-class cricketers

References

External links
 

1900 births
1987 deaths
Australian cricketers
Queensland cricketers
Cricketers from Queensland